Romanization of Bulgarian is the practice of transliteration of text in Bulgarian from its conventional Cyrillic orthography into the Latin alphabet. Romanization can be used for various purposes, such as rendering of proper names and place names in foreign-language contexts, or for informal writing of Bulgarian in environments where Cyrillic is not easily available. Official use of romanization by Bulgarian authorities is found, for instance, in identity documents and in road signage. Several different standards of transliteration exist, one of which was chosen and made mandatory for common use by the Bulgarian authorities in a law of 2009.

Features
The various romanization systems differ with respect to 12 out of the 30 letters of the modern Bulgarian alphabet. The remaining 18 have constant mappings in all romanization schemes:
а→a, б→b, в→v, г→g, д→d, е→e, з→z, и→i, к→k, л→l, м→m, н→n, о→o, п→p, р→r, с→s, т→t, ф→f. Differences exist with respect to the following:
 letters involving the glide sound /j/, where some systems use Latin  and some Latin : й→j/y, ю→ju/yu, я→ja/ya; also ь→’/j/y.
 letters denoting palatal/alveolar fricatives and affricates. Here, the choice is mostly between Latin letters with diacritics, as used in many Latin-based orthographies of other Slavic languages, and digraph combinations, as used in English: ж→ž/zh, ч→č/ch, ш→š/sh, щ→št/ŝ/sht.
 the letter ъ, which in Bulgarian (unlike Russian, where it is not pronounced at all) denotes a special schwa-like vowel.

Standards
Three different systems have been adopted officially by Bulgarian authorities at overlapping times.

ISO/R 9:1968
An older system in the tradition of common Slavic scientific transliteration was adopted by the Council of Orthography and Transcription of Geographical Names in Sofia in 1972 and subsequently by the UN in 1977. It is identical to that codified in the ISO norm ISO/R 9:1968. It was adopted in 1973 as the Bulgarian state standard BDS 1596:1973 which, although still valid formally is no longer used in practice, having been superseded by the 2009 Transliteration Act.

French-oriented
The second system was a French-oriented transliteration of personal and place names in the documents issued by the Bulgarian Ministry of Interior for travel abroad, used until 1999.

English-oriented digraph systems
Systems based on a radically different principle, which avoids diacritics and is optimized for compatibility with English sound-letter correspondences, have come into official use in Bulgaria since the mid-1990s.

Danchev
One such system was proposed in Danchev et al.'s English Dictionary of Bulgarian Names of 1989.

Streamlined System
A similar system (differing from the former in the treatment of letters ъ, у, and digraphs ай, ей, ой and уй), called the "Streamlined System" by Ivanov (2003) and Gaidarska (1998), was adopted in 1995 for use in Bulgarian-related place names in Antarctica by the Antarctic Place-names Commission of Bulgaria. Another system along similar lines, differing from the Antarctic one only in the treatment of ц ( vs. ), was adopted by the Bulgarian authorities for use in identity documents in 1999; after an amendment in 2000, the official Bulgarian system became identical with that of the Antarctica Commission.

The new official Bulgarian system does not allow for unambiguous mapping back into Cyrillic, since unlike most other systems it does not distinguish between ъ and а (both rendered as a).

New Orthographic Dictionary system
A modification of the system using a diacritic was proposed in the authoritative New Orthographic Dictionary of the Bulgarian Language in 2002, with ъ rendered as ă rather than a.  However, that proposal was not adopted for official usage, and failed to become established in popular practice.

Streamlined System with -ia-exception
An exception to the rules was introduced by the Bulgarian authorities in 2006, mandating the transliteration of word-final -ия as -ia rather than -iya in given names and geographical names (such as Ilia, Maria and Bulgaria, Sofia, Trakia etc.). In 2009, a law passed by the Bulgarian parliament made this system mandatory for all official use and some types of private publications, expanding also the application of the ia-exception rule to all -ия in word-final position.

The Streamlined system was adopted by UN in 2012, and by BGN and PCGN in 2013.

According to Arenstein, “The international roots of the Bulgarian romanization system strike at the core of one of romanization’s most perplexing paradoxes: an impulse to redefine and distinguish national identity while also ensuring the accessibility of that identity to outside groups. In other words, instilling nationalism with a sense of internationalism.”

Streamlined System with unambiguous reverse mapping
A variant of the Streamlined System allowing for unambiguous mapping back into Cyrillic was proposed by Ivanov, Skordev and Dobrev in 2010 to be used in cases when the retrieval of the original Cyrillic forms is essential. For that purpose, certain Cyrillic letters and combinations of letters are transliterated as follows: ъ→`a, ь→`y, зх→z|h, йа→y|a, йу→y|u, сх→s|h, тс→t|s, тш→t|sh, тщ→t|sht, шт→sh|t, шц→sh|ts, ия (in final position, if the ia-exception rule is applied) →i|a. The standard transliteration form of a given text is obtained from its unambiguously reversible one by simply removing the additional symbols ` and |.

Other
Systems along similar lines to the new official Bulgarian system, though with differences regarding the letters х, ъ, ь, ю and я, have also been in use in the ALA-LC Romanization scheme of the Library of Congress, British Standard 2959:1958, the now-superseded 1952 BGN/PCGN romanization of the United States and British geographic naming institutions, and the 1917 system of the British Academy.

The GOST 7.79-2000 "Rules of transliteration of Cyrillic script by Latin alphabet" contains an unambiguous and reversible ASCII-compatible transliteration system for Bulgarian: й→j, х→x, ц→c or cz, ч→ch, ш→sh, щ→sth, ъ→a`, ь→`, ю→yu, я→ya.

Archaic letters
The archaic Cyrillic letters ѣ and ѫ, which were part of the pre-1945 orthography of Bulgarian, are variously transcribed as ⟨i͡e, e⟩, as ⟨ya, ě⟩, and as ⟨u̐, ŭǎ⟩, respectively, in the ALA/LC, BGN/PCGN and ISO 9 standards.

Comparison table

Romanization sample

Personalized and stylized writing 
Some people and companies prefer to use or retain personalized spellings of their own names in Latin. Examples are politicians Ivan Stancioff (instead of "Stanchov") and Simeon Djankov (instead of "Dyankov"), and beer brand Kamenitza (instead of Kamenitsa).  The freedom of using different Roman transliterations of personal names is guaranteed by Article 2(2) of the governmental 2010 Regulation for Issuing of Bulgarian Personal Documents.

Informal writing 
Sometimes, especially in e-mail or text messaging, the Cyrillic alphabet is not available and people are forced to write in Roman script. This often does not follow the official or any other of the standards listed above, but rather is an idiosyncratic Bulgarian form of text speak. While most letters are straightforward, several can take different forms. The letter variants listed below are often used interchangeably with some or all of the above standards, often in the same message.

There is no set rule, and people often vary the combinations within a single message, so that "ъ" may be presented as "u", "a" or "y" in three adjacent words, and "щ" can be "sht" in one word, and "6t" in the next, and "ю" may be written differently in the same word. Conversely, "j" could be used to represent "й", "ж" and even "дж" in adjacent words, while "y" can be used for "ъ" in one word and for "й" in the next.

This unofficial email/SMS language is often referred to as "shlyokavitsa" The use of Latinised Bulgarian, while ubiquitous in personal communication, is frowned upon in certain internet contexts, and many websites' comment sections and internet forums have rules stating that posts in Roman script will be deleted.

See also
Belarusian alphabet
Cyrillic alphabets
Cyrillic script
Faux Cyrillic
Greek alphabet
Macedonian alphabet
Montenegrin alphabet
Romanization of Belarusian
Romanization of Greek
Romanization of Macedonian
Romanization of Russian
Romanization of Ukrainian
Russian alphabet
Scientific transliteration of Cyrillic
Serbian Cyrillic alphabet
Ukrainian alphabet

Notes

References
British Standard 2979 : 1958, London: British Standards Institution.
G. Gerych. Transliteration of Cyrillic Alphabets. Ottawa University, April 1965. 126 pp.

External links
Lingua:Translit Perl module and online service covering a variety of writing systems. Transliteration according to several standards including ISO 9, DIN 1460 and the "Streamlined System" for Bulgarian.
2cyr.com - A free online service for transliterating Bulgarian (Cyrillic) into Bulgarian (Latin script). Users can set their own personal preference for the letter substitutions of the transliteration.
Slovored.com/transliteration - Another free online transliteration service (it uses the Streamlined System with the -ia exception mentioned above).

 Bulgarian language
Bulgarian